Rebecca Aguilar (born 1958), a television commentator, news consultant, social media trainer and freelance reporter in the Dallas area.

Career
Rebecca Aguilar is currently a freelance reporter, television commentator, news consultant, social media columnist and motivational speaker.  Aguilar has worked for several television stations around the country, including KTXD-TV (Dallas) where she was a TV commentator. She has worked as a television reporter at WDHO-TV in Toledo Ohio, KRIS-TV in Corpus Christi, TX, KENS-TV, San Antonio, TX, USA Today on TV in Washington, DC, KPNX-TV in Phoenix, AZ, KNBC-TV in Los Angeles, CA, and KDFW-TV, Dallas, TX.

Her first reporting post in 1981 was at ABC in Toledo. She has won 50 awards and nominations for her journalism work, including several Emmys. Her last Emmy nomination happened in 2014 when she was nominated for her work on the TV show, The Texas Daily.  In 2005, Texas AP named her reporter of the year. The National Association of Hispanic Journalists named her Broadcast Journalist of the Year in 2007, and she has been a member of their board since 2010 as the general at-large officer.

Aguilar was suspended by KDFW-TV, a Fox affiliate, on 16 October 2007 following an interview the previous day with a 70-year-old salvage merchant." Aguilar told Uncle Barky, a media critic in Dallas that the news managers gave her the assignment and approved the interview to air on KDFW, but made her the scapegoat when numerous viewers complained to the station.

She received threats for the report. Although news management assigned her to the elderly man's interview, they would later claim it  was "overly aggressive". Following her firing in March 2008, Aguilar filed a complaint with the Equal Employment Opportunity Commission. She unsuccessfully sued Fox for wrongful dismissal, losing the jury trial in December 2010.

Aguilar continues to freelance in journalism but now has one of the largest Latina virtual groups on Facebook and LinkedIn.  Facebook.

Aguilar has also been recognized with two national social media awards from Latinos in Social Media also known as LATISM. It has  awarded Aguilar in 2011 and 2013 as "Social Network Leader" of the year.  Today Wise Latinas Linked has a following of more than 8,000 women.

Personal life
Aguilar was born in Napoleon, Ohio. Her parents were undocumented workers who came to this country from Mexico.  Her parents eventually obtained green cards. 

Her father was a union organizer for the United Auto Workers. Her mother became a migrants rights advocate.  Together her parents worked on civil rights issues.

Aguilar graduated from Napoleon High School and got her Communications degree from Bowling Green State University, minoring in journalism.

In 2015, the Napoleon High School Alumni board honored Aguilar with the Hall of Fame award for her achievements in journalism.

References

1958 births
Living people
People from Napoleon, Ohio
American freelance journalists
Bowling Green State University alumni
Date of birth missing (living people)
Journalists from Ohio